The 2019 Tsuen Wan District Council election was held on 24 November 2019 to elect all 19 elected members to the 21-member Tsuen Wan District Council.

The pro-democrats seized the control of the council in the historic landslide victory in the 2019 election amid the massive pro-democracy protests by taking 16 of the 19 elected seats in the council.

Overall election results
Before election:

Change in composition:

References

External links
 Election Results - Overall Results

2019 Hong Kong local elections